Richard P. Morris (December 23, 1855 – April 2, 1925) was an American politician who served as the Mayor of Salt Lake City from 1904 to 1905.

References

1855 births
1925 deaths
Mayors of Salt Lake City